This is a list of properties and historic districts in Oklahoma that are designated on the National Register of Historic Places.  Listings are distributed across all of Oklahoma's 77 counties.

The following are approximate unofficial tallies of current listings by county.

Current listings by county

See also
List of National Historic Landmarks in Oklahoma
List of bridges on the National Register of Historic Places in Oklahoma

References

External links

Flickr photo group for Oklahoma NRHP

 
Oklahoma